Pezhman Noor (born October 15, 1981 in Tehran) is an Iranian musician and composer. He In 2019, he won the first-place prize in flamenco music national competition.

Early life 
Pezhman Noor was Born in Tehran , he is the second of three siblings. His motive, Paco De Lucia, moved him towards flamenco music in his teens. He started his career when he was 16. Ever since, he has been to a variety of flamenco events and activities. His very first concert was held in "Saviz" Movies in Karaj in 2005. Ten years later, he traveled to Germany and attended Rafael Cortez master classes and took advantages of his experiences. He also was invited to play in a flamenco concert in Dr. Hoch's Konservatorium. He served as the jury in flamenco music festival in 2017 and 2018.

Artistic life 
In commemoration of the prominent flamenco guitar player, Paco De Lucia, held in "Ivane Shams" amphitheater, he performed before the vice cultural minister of Spain embassy which led to an invitation to the ambassador's home. He performed pieces of flamenco music in presence of the ambassador and his guests. In 2019, he added to his résumé by holding two concerts in Zanjan and Shiraz.

He in 2010, in "national youth festival", which was a governmental event, gained the first grade again and was prized by the then vice president. In 2017, he accompanied a philharmonic rhetoric orchestra to perform Aranjuez concert on stage. This performance was repeated a couple of months later in "Vahdat" amphitheater. He also became the top musician of the National Flamenco Guitar Festival in 2020.

Discography

References

External links
 
 
 Pezhman Noor on Spotify
 

1981 births
Living people
Iranian composers
People from Tehran